The General Authority for Border Protection is an agency that is part of the Government of Mongolia and acts as a reserve force for the Armed Forces of Mongolia. It guards the country's entry and exit near Russia and China as well as prevents/suppresses illegal activities such as smuggling and human trafficking. It also is responsible for border patrol and the regulation of illegal immigration. The agency is support by over 3,000 personnel across 300-350 permanent border guard units from the Mongolian Armed Forces, the National Police Agency and other government agencies. It is currently an agency of the Mongolian Ministry of Justice and Home Affairs.

History

The Border Troops of the Mongolian People's Army were manifested in the 15,000 strong Border and Internal Troops Administration during the Cold War. They were equipped with helicopters, motor vehicles, signals equipment, as well as engineering equipment. It was established as the frontier guard in 1933 to manage Mongolian borders with the USSR and Manchuria. During the Battles of Khalkhin Gol, western border was heavily guarded by MPA personnel who defended the country from  an invasion by the Imperial Japanese Army. In 1959, the Ministry of Defense created a Border Service Division and gave. In 1993, the "Border Law" was approved and the Border Guard Administration was established. The Border Protection Agency was more of a regulatory agency under the Ministry of Defense and has since 1996 has been under the direct command of the Ministry of Justice and Home Affairs since 2000 and has been appointed as the regulatory agency of the Border Troops Management Authority. Since 2002, it has been officially called the General Authority for Border Protection.

See also 
 List of national border guard agencies
 Official Website (in Mongolian)
 Official Website (in English)

References 

Mongolia
Law enforcement in Mongolia
Military of Mongolia
1933 establishments in Mongolia
Government agencies established in 1933